Chlorocypha dispar is a species of jewel damselfly in the family Chlorocyphidae.

The IUCN conservation status of Chlorocypha dispar is "LC", least concern, with no immediate threat to the species' survival. The IUCN status was reviewed in 2018.

References

Further reading

 

Chlorocyphidae
Articles created by Qbugbot
Insects described in 1807